Paul Jobert (19 August 1863 – 24 March 1942) was a French painter. His work was part of the painting event in the art competition at the 1928 Summer Olympics.

References

Further reading
 François Bellec, Carnets de voyage des peintres de la marine, Éditions Ouest France, 2008
 Anne Châtel-Demenge, Comment j'ai tué le consul, Éditions de l'Aube, 2012, 227 p.()
 Lydia Harambourg, Dictionnaire des peintres paysagistes français du XIXe, Ides et calendes, 1986, 360 p.
 Jean-Noël Marchand, Dictionnaire des peintres français de la mer et de la marine, Éditions Art et Marine, Paris, 1997
 Les peintres officiels de la Marine, Éditions Le Télégramme, 2002
 Marion Vidal-Bué, "Le peintre Paul Jobert - Un algérien entre deux mers (1863-1942)", dans L'Algérianiste, no 134, June 2011, pp. 60–69

1863 births
1942 deaths
20th-century French painters
20th-century French male artists
French male painters
Olympic competitors in art competitions
People from Tlemcen